The 2021 The Citadel Bulldogs football team represented The Citadel in the 2021 NCAA Division I FCS football season as a member of the Southern Conference (SoCon). The Bulldogs were led by sixth-year head coach Brent Thompson and played their home games at Johnson Hagood Stadium in Charleston, South Carolina.

Schedule

References

Citadel
The Citadel Bulldogs football seasons
Citadel Bulldogs football